The Bordellos of Algiers is a 1927 German silent drama film directed by Wolfgang Hoffmann-Harnisch and starring Maria Jacobini, Camilla Horn and Warwick Ward. The film was shot on location in North Africa. The film's sets were designed by the art directors Hans Jacoby and Bruno Krauskopf. It premiered at the UFA-Palast am Zoo in Berlin.

Cast

References

Bibliography

External links

1927 films
Films of the Weimar Republic
1927 drama films
German silent feature films
German drama films
Films set in Algiers
UFA GmbH films
German black-and-white films
Silent drama films
Films shot in Algeria
1920s German films
1920s German-language films